Isaia is an Italian menswear brand founded in Naples in 1920.
The brand is recognized by its  tiny red coral logo, which is a good-luck charm in Naples.

Gianluca Isaia is the chief executive officer. Its brother brand is Eidos (είδος meaning "species,  essence, form, brand, genre" in Greek), launched in 2013 by ISAIA Napoli.

Stores
Isaia has monobrand stores in Naples, Baku, Beverly Hills, Capri, Ekaterinburg, Hong Kong, Kyiv, Macao, Milan, Moscow, Ulaanbaatar, New York City, St. Petersburg, San Francisco, Chicago, Toronto and Tokyo.

History
Isaia was founded in Naples by Enrico Isaia, who opened a fabric store for  Neapolitan tailors, and later a small atelier next to the store.
In 1957 the brothers Enrico, Rosario and Corrado Isaia moved the business to Casalnuovo, a village near Napoli where tailoring was a large part of the economy, and Isaia became a men's tailoring company.
Enrico Isaia died at age 84 on 7 March 2017.

Coral legend

In Naples, the mythical origin story of red coral is well known. As the legend goes, the Greek hero Perseus killed the Gorgon Medusa and wanted to deliver her head as a wedding present to the King of Seriphos, who was about to wed his mother. On his way home, he saw the beautiful Andromeda chained to a rock and about to be eaten by a sea monster. Wanting to save her life, he killed the beast and then sat on the bank of the water to wash his hands. When he set the sack with Medusa’s head besides him, her blood dripped into the water and transformed into what we know as red coral. For this, Neapolitans consider red coral a sign of good luck, and they use it in everything from pendants to religious ornaments to jewelry.

Products
Isaia is most known for its tailored clothing. In 2020, the brand produced denim with a customized selvage and a traditional Neapolitan proverb embroidered on the inside.

Philanthropy

Isaia supports Capodimonte Museum in its hometown of Naples.

See also 
 Italian fashion
 Made in Italy

References

External links 
 

Clothing brands of Italy
Luxury brands
Companies based in Naples
High fashion brands
Italian suit makers
Clothing companies established in 1920
Italian companies established in 1920
Altagamma members